Poshlost or Poshlost'  is a Russian word  for a particular negative human character trait or man-made thing or idea.  It has been cited as an example of a so-called untranslatable word, as there is no single exact one-word English equivalent.  It carries much cultural baggage in Russia and has been discussed at length by various writers.

It is derived from the adjective 
пошлый.

Description
It has been defined as "petty evil or self-satisfied vulgarity", while Svetlana Boym defines it briefly as "obscenity and bad taste".

Boym goes on to describe it at more length:

Early examinations of poshlost in literature are in the work of Nikolai Gogol.  Gogol wrote (of Pushkin),

In his novels, Turgenev "tried to develop a heroic figure who could, with the verve and abandon of a Don Quixote, grapple with the problems of Russian society, who could once and for all overcome 'poshlost’, the complacent mediocrity and moral degeneration of his environment".  Dostoyevsky applied the word to the Devil; Solzhenitsyn, to Western-influenced young people.

D. S. Mirsky was an early user of the word in English in writing about Gogol; he defined it as "'self-satisfied inferiority,' moral and spiritual".  Vladimir Nabokov made it more widely known in his book on Gogol, where he romanized it as "poshlust" (punningly: "posh" + "lust"). Poshlust, Nabokov explained, "is not only the obviously trashy but mainly the falsely important, the falsely beautiful, the falsely clever, the falsely attractive.  A list of literary characters personifying poshlust will include... Polonius and the royal pair in Hamlet, Rodolphe and Homais from Madame Bovary, Laevsky in Chekhov's 'The Duel', Joyce's Marion [Molly] Bloom, young Bloch in Search of Lost Time, Maupassant's 'Bel Ami', Anna Karenina's husband, and Berg in War and Peace".  also listed

Azar Nafisi mentions it and quotes the "falsely" definition in Reading Lolita in Tehran.

Nabokov often targeted poshlost in his own work; the Alexandrov definition above refers to the character of M'sieur Pierre in Invitation to a Beheading.

Another notable literary treatment is Fyodor Sologub's novel The Petty Demon.  It tells the story of a provincial schoolteacher, Peredonov, notable for his complete lack of redeeming human qualities. James H. Billington said of it:

Richard Taruskin summarized poshlost as "highfalutin bad taste," applying the term to a performance of the Cantata for the 20th Anniversary of the October Revolution (Prokofiev).

See also
wikt:некультурный

References

Bibliography

  The original interview, with Herbert Gold in the October 1967 issue of the Paris Review, is available on line, and an extract is available in a Time article (Dec. 1, 1967) about the interview.

Aesthetics
Russian culture
Russian words and phrases